Simon Edy, known as Old Simon, (1709-18 May 1783) was a London beggar who may have served as an inspiration for a popular nursery rhyme. He lived in a derelict "Rats' Castle" in the rookery of Dyott Street. He was born in Woodford in Northamptonshire in 1709 and died on 18 May 1783. He had a succession of dogs and the last of them was a drover's sheepdog called Rover.

He begged outside the churchyard of St Giles in the Fields and was a well-known figure, being portrayed by artists including John Seago and Thomas Rowlandson.  He wore several hats, coats, rings and collected much bric-a-brac such as cuttings from old newspapers like The Gentleman's Magazine, from which he regaled passers-by.  As he was a simpleton, he is thought to be a possible inspiration for the nursery rhyme, Simple Simon, which was published in the Royal Book of Nursery Rhymes nearby in Monmouth Court.

References

Beggars
People from North Northamptonshire
1709 births
1783 deaths